Andinobates abditus is a species of poison dart frog, sometimes known as the Collins' poison frog. It is endemic to Ecuador where it is only known from its type locality, at the eastern base of the Reventador volcano, in the Napo Province.

Andinobates abditus no longer survives in its type locality, although it is possible that it occurs elsewhere (including the nearby Cayambe Coca Ecological Reserve, but its presence there has not been confirmed). The disappearance from the type locality was due to habitat loss, possibly together Batrachochytrium dendrobatidis infection. The type locality was characterized by dense, humid forest with many mosses and epiphytes.

References

Amphibians described in 1976
Andinobates
Amphibians of Ecuador
Endemic fauna of Ecuador